Arue is a commune in the suburbs of Papeete in French Polynesia, an overseas territory of France in the Pacific Ocean. Arue is located on the island of Tahiti, in the administrative subdivision of the Windward Islands, themselves part of the Society Islands. At the 2017 census it had a population of 10,243.

History
The area of Arue was first settled by travelers from Asia during the year of 1000. They had built houses out of grass and mud. The Polynesians had hunted fish with spears. Captain James Cook had arrived at Tahiti to observe the Transit of Venus.

The James Norman Hall Museum is located in Arue - it is a historic house museum that exhibits the home of the writer of The Bounty Trilogy as it was in 1951.

References

Communes of French Polynesia